The 180th New York State Legislature, consisting of the New York State Senate and the New York State Assembly, met from January 3, 1973, to May 30, 1974, during the fifteenth  and final year of Nelson Rockefeller's governorship, and during Malcolm Wilson's governorship, in Albany.

Background
Under the provisions of the New York Constitution of 1938, and the U.S. Supreme Court decision to follow the One man, one vote rule, re-apportioned in 1971 by the Legislature, 60 Senators and 150 assemblymen were elected in single-seat districts for two-year terms. Senate and Assembly districts consisted of approximately the same number of inhabitants, the area being apportioned without restrictions regarding county boundaries.

At this time there were two major political parties: the Republican Party and the Democratic Party. The Conservative Party and the Liberal Party also nominated tickets.

Elections
The New York state election, 1972, was held on November 7. The only three statewide elective offices up for election were three seats on the New York Court of Appeals. All three seats were won by Republican judges, two with Conservative endorsement, and one with Liberal endorsement. The approximate party strength at this election, as expressed by the average vote for Judge of the Court of Appeals, was: Republicans 2,847,000; Democrats 2,709,000; Conservatives 425,000; and Liberals 258,000. To date this was the last time a Republican majority was elected to the State Assembly.

Of the three women members of the previous legislature, Assemblywoman Mary Anne Krupsak (Dem.), a lawyer of Amsterdam, was elected to the State Senate; and Assemblywomen Constance E. Cook (Rep.), a lawyer of Ithaca; and Rosemary R. Gunning (Cons.), a lawyer of Ridgewood, Queens; were re-elected to the Assembly. Karen Burstein, a lawyer of Lawrence, and Carol Bellamy, a lawyer of Brooklyn, were also elected to the State Senate; and Estella B. Diggs, of the Bronx, was also elected to the Assembly.

The New York state election, 1973, was held on November 6. The only statewide elective office up for election was the Chief Judge of the New York Court of Appeals. Republican Charles D. Breitel was elected with Liberal endorsement. One vacancy in the State Senate and five vacancies in the Assembly were filled. Elizabeth Connelly (Dem.), of Staten Island, was elected to the Assembly.

Sessions
The Legislature met for the first regular session (the 196th) at the State Capitol in Albany on January 3, 1973; and adjourned sine die on May 28.

Perry B. Duryea, Jr. (Rep.) was re-elected Speaker.

Warren M. Anderson (Rep.) was elected Temporary President of the State Senate.

The Legislature met for a special session at the State Capitol in Albany on July 25, 1973; and adjourned sine die on July 31. This session was called to consider the issue of a $3.5 million bond issue to finance the construction of additional public transportation capacities in New York City.

The Legislature met for the second regular session (the 197th) at the State Capitol in Albany on January 9, 1974; and adjourned sine die in the early morning of May 17.

The U.S. Department of Justice found fault with the congressional, senatorial and Assembly districts in Manhattan and Brooklyn under the apportionment of 1971, and ordered a revision to safeguard the rights of minorities.

The Legislature met for another special session at the State Capitol in Albany on May 29, 1974; and adjourned sine die on the next day. This session was called to remap the legislative districts in Manhattan and Brooklyn, and to amend the rent-control law passed during the regular session. The Senate passed Governor Wilson's rent law amendment, but the Assembly did not come to a vote on it.

On July 1, the U.S. Department of Justice accepted the revised districts as passed by the Legislature.

State Senate

Senators
The asterisk (*) denotes members of the previous Legislature who continued in office as members of this Legislature. Chester J. Straub, Vander L. Beatty, Joseph R. Pisani, Mary Anne Krupsak, Edwyn E. Mason and James T. McFarland changed from the Assembly to the Senate at the beginning of the session.

Note: For brevity, the chairmanships omit the words "...the Committee on (the)..."

Employees
 Secretary: Albert J. Abrams

State Assembly

Assemblymen
The asterisk (*) denotes members of the previous Legislature who continued in office as members of this Legislature. George A. Murphy and John J. LaFalce changed from the Senate to the Assembly at the beginning of the session.

Note: For brevity, the chairmanships omit the words "...the Committee on (the)..."

Employees
 Clerk: Donald A. Campbell, until February 1973, resigned
 Thomas H. Bartzos, acting from February 1973, appointed as clerk in January 1974

Notes

Sources
 Listing Of New York Metropolitan Area Legislators and Names. Addresses Of Upstate Legislators in the Civil Service Leader (Vol. XXXIV, No. 5; issue of May 1, 1973; pg. 8f)
 Six Seats in State Legislature To Be Filled in Tuesday Voting in the Amsterdam Recorder, of Amsterdam, on November 5, 1973
 Listing of New York Congressmen and Legislators in the Civil Service Leader (Vol. XXXIV, No. 50; issue of March 12, 1974; pg. 8f)

180
1973 in New York (state)
1974 in New York (state)
1973 U.S. legislative sessions
1974 U.S. legislative sessions